John Louis Bates ( – ) was an ice hockey defender who played in the English National League for the Wembley Lions. He was born in Ottawa, Ontario, Canada and died in London, England. He is a member of the British Ice Hockey Hall of Fame.

Hockey career
Lou Bates toured Britain twice with an all-star team from Ottawa before he spent a year in Paris, France. Bates signed for the Wembley Lions for their inaugural season in 1934. Bates established himself as one of the most popular players in pre-war Britain and, as such, featured on a cigarette card and in a cinema advert for Player's cigarettes.

Bates played as the captain for the Lions until play was stopped in May 1940 due to the outbreak of war. When play resumed following the war in 1946, Bates returned to the Lions for the 1946–47 season as coach. He also coached Streatham in 1951.

During the 1950 European championships, Bates was the Head Coach for the British team and guided them to a silver medal.

Awards
Named to the English National League All-star B-team in 1935–36.
Named to the English National League All-star A-team in 1939–40.
Inducted to the British Ice Hockey Hall of Fame in 1950.

References
A to Z Encyclopaedia of Ice Hockey
British Film Institute
Ice Hockey Journalists UK
The Internet Hockey Database

External links

British Ice Hockey Hall of Fame entry

1912 births
1987 deaths
British Ice Hockey Hall of Fame inductees
Canadian ice hockey defencemen
Ice hockey people from Ottawa
Wembley Lions players
Canadian expatriate ice hockey players in England